Maria Sanford is a bronze sculpture of the American educator of the same name by Evelyn Raymond, installed in the United States Capitol Visitor Center's Emancipation Hall, in Washington, D.C., as part of the National Statuary Hall Collection. The statue was gifted by the U.S. state of Minnesota in 1958.

See also
 1958 in art

References

External links
 

1958 establishments in Washington, D.C.
1958 sculptures
Bronze sculptures in Washington, D.C.
Monuments and memorials to women
Sanford, Maria
Sculptures of women in Washington, D.C.